Klara is a Belgian radio station operated by the Flemish public broadcaster Vlaamse Radio- en Televisieomroep (VRT). Its output is primarily focussed on classical music, but also includes jazz and world music.

The name is derived from Klassieke Radio, which translates as "Classical Radio".

History
Klara was launched on 2 December 2000 as successor to VRT Radio 3. The change of name marked the introduction of a new programming style aimed at broadening the appeal of VRT's classical music channel.

Logos and identities

See also
 List of radio stations in Belgium

References

External links

Radio stations established in 2000
Dutch-language radio stations in Belgium
Classical music radio stations